Masks and Faces is a British historical comedy play written by Charles Reade and Tom Taylor which was first performed in 1852. It features the Irish actress Peg Woffington (1720-1760) as a major character. It proved popular, earning the writers £150. The following year, to capitalize on the play's success Reade wrote a novel Peg Woffington which was also a major hit.

Adaptations
The play and the subsequent novel provided inspiration for a number of films, mostly made during the silent era. These included Peg Woffington (1912), Masks and Faces (1917) and Peg of Old Drury (1935).

References

Bibliography
 Sutherland, John. The Longman Companion to Victorian Fiction. Routledge, 2014.

1852 plays
British plays adapted into films
Plays set in England
Plays by Charles Reade
Broadway plays